The Roman Catholic Diocese of Duluth is a Roman Catholic diocese in Minnesota. The episcopal see is in Duluth, Minnesota. The diocese includes Aitkin, Carlton, Cass, Cook, Crow Wing, Itasca, Koochiching, Lake, Pine and St. Louis Counties.

History
The diocese was established on October 3, 1889 by Pope Leo XIII.  Its territory was taken from the Vicariate Apostolic of Northern Minnesota.

In 2020, Michel Mulloy, a priest of the Diocese of Rapid City, was appointed Bishop of Duluth but resigned the appointment before it took effect due to allegations that he sexually abused a minor.

Sex abuse and bankruptcy

The Diocese of Duluth filed for Chapter 11 bankruptcy protection on December 7, 2015 after facing a nearly $5 million verdict, six lawsuits and a dozen additional claims stemming from child sexual abuse cases. In May 2019, the Diocese of Duluth agreed to pay $40 million to 125 plaintiffs suing the Diocese for allowing 37 priests to sexually abuse them.

Bishops
The list of bishops of the diocese and their terms of service:
 James McGolrick (1889–1918)
 John Timothy McNicholas, O.P. (1918–1925), appointed Archbishop of Cincinnati
 Thomas Anthony Welch (1925–1959)
 Francis Joseph Schenk (1960–1969)
 Paul Francis Anderson (1969–1982), appointed Auxiliary Bishop of Sioux Falls
 Robert Henry Brom (1983–1989), appointed Coadjutor Bishop and later Bishop of San Diego
 Roger Lawrence Schwietz, O.M.I. (1989–2000), appointed Coadjutor Archbishop and later Archbishop of Anchorage
 Dennis Marion Schnurr (2001–2008), appointed Coadjutor Archbishop and later Archbishop of Cincinnati
 Paul Sirba (2009–2019)
 Daniel John Felton (2021–present)

Coadjutor bishop
Paul Francis Anderson (1968-1969)

Auxiliary bishop
Lawrence Alexander Glenn (1956-1960), appointed Bishop of Crookston

Other priest of this diocese who became bishop
Peter Michael Muhich, appointed Bishop of Rapid City in 2020

See also
 Catholic Church by country
 Catholic Church in the United States
 Ecclesiastical Province of Saint Paul and Minneapolis
 Global organisation of the Catholic Church
 List of Roman Catholic archdioceses (by country and continent)
 List of Roman Catholic dioceses (alphabetical) (including archdioceses)
 List of Roman Catholic dioceses (structured view) (including archdioceses)
 List of the Catholic dioceses of the United States

References

External links 
Roman Catholic Diocese of Duluth Official Site
Duluth at Catholic Encyclopedia

 
Duluth
Diocese of Duluth
Religious organizations established in 1889
Duluth
Duluth
Companies that filed for Chapter 11 bankruptcy in 2015